Assuéfry (also spelled Assuéffry) is a town in the far east of Ivory Coast. It is a sub-prefecture of Transua Department in Gontougo Region, Zanzan District. Assuéfry is also a commune.

In 2014, the population of the sub-prefecture of Assuéfry was 30,406.

Villages
The twenty seven villages of the sub-prefecture of Assuéfry and their population in 2014 are:

Notes

Sub-prefectures of Gontougo
Communes of Gontougo